Delaware's 10th Senate district is one of 21 districts in the Delaware Senate. It has been represented by Democrat Stephanie Hansen since 2017, following an expensive and intensely-watched special election to replace fellow Democrat Bethany Hall-Long.

Geography
District 10 is based in Middletown, also covering Mount Pleasant, Summit Bridge, western Glasgow, and the southernmost reaches of Newark.

Like all districts in the state, the 10th Senate district is located entirely within Delaware's at-large congressional district. It overlaps with the 8th, 9th, 25th, and 27th districts of the Delaware House of Representatives. It borders the state of Maryland.

Recent election results
Delaware Senators are elected to staggered four-year terms. Under normal circumstances, the 10th district holds elections in midterm years, except immediately after redistricting, when all seats are up for election regardless of usual cycle.

2018

2017 special
Following Bethany Hall-Long's election as Lieutenant Governor of Delaware in 2016, a special election was held in February 2017.

2014

2012

Federal and statewide results in District 10

References 

10
New Castle County, Delaware